Unseo station is a railway station on AREX.  Unseo-dong is the site of Airport Town Square (공항신도시), a relatively new town with hotels and other facilities for those going to or coming from Incheon International Airport.

Station layout

Railway stations opened in 2007
Metro stations in Incheon
Jung District, Incheon
Seoul Metropolitan Subway stations